Hamza Amari (born 2 October 2002) is an Algerian cyclist, who currently rides for UCI Continental team .

Major results

2019
 1st Stages 3 & 4 Tour du Sahel
 3rd Road race, National Junior Road Championships
2021
 1st Stage 2 Classique Tipaza
2022
 1st  Time trial, National Under-23 Road Championships
 1st Overall International Syrian Tour
1st Stage 1
 1st Overall Tour de Gardaia
1st Stage 3
 1st Overall GP Ville de Oran
1st Stage 1
 3rd  Road race, African Road Championships
 6th Overall Tour d'Algérie
 6th Road race, Arab Road Championships
2023
 1st  Team time trial, African Road Championships
 2nd Overall La Tropicale Amissa Bongo
1st  Young rider classification

References

External links
 

2002 births
Living people
Algerian male cyclists
Place of birth missing (living people)
Mediterranean Games competitors for Algeria
21st-century Algerian people
Competitors at the 2022 Mediterranean Games